

Siegfried Haß (7 June 1898 – 14 December 1987) was a general in the Wehrmacht of Nazi Germany during World War II who commanded several divisions. He was a recipient of the Knight's Cross of the Iron Cross.

Awards and decorations 

 Knight's Cross of the Iron Cross on 18 February 1945 as Generalleutnant and commander of 170. Infanterie-Division

References

Citations

Bibliography

 

1898 births
1987 deaths
Military personnel from Solingen
Lieutenant generals of the German Army (Wehrmacht)
German Army personnel of World War I
Recipients of the clasp to the Iron Cross, 1st class
Recipients of the Knight's Cross of the Iron Cross
German prisoners of war in World War II held by the United Kingdom
People from the Rhine Province
20th-century Freikorps personnel